The Upland Rider is a 1928 American silent Western film directed by Albert S. Rogell and written by Ford Beebe. The film stars Ken Maynard, Ena Gregory, Lafe McKee, Sydney Jarvis, Robert D. Walker and Bobby Dunn. The film was released on June 3, 1928, by First National Pictures.

Cast    
 Ken Maynard as Dan Dailey
 Ena Gregory as Sally Graham 
 Lafe McKee as John Graham
 Sydney Jarvis as Ross Cheswick 
 Robert D. Walker as Bernt
 Bobby Dunn as Shorty
 David Kirby as Red
 Robert Milasch as Slim
 Tarzan as Tarzan

References

External links
 

1928 films
1920s English-language films
1928 Western (genre) films
First National Pictures films
Films directed by Albert S. Rogell
American black-and-white films
Silent American Western (genre) films
1920s American films